Waifs & Strays is an Ian McNabb album of previously unreleased archival material recorded between 1993 and 2000.

Critical response
Andrew Mueller gave a critical review stating that "the songs here, while occasionally affecting, are mostly a series of explanations for McNabb's relative obscurity." He also stated that "Waifs & Strays is the definitive cult item", but conceded that "Its release makes a certain amount of sense".

Track listing

References

Ian McNabb albums
2001 compilation albums